Partisans of Freedom: A Study in American Anarchism is a 1976 history book about the history of anarchism in the United States by William O. Reichert.

References 

 
 
 
 
 
 

1976 non-fiction books
American history books
History books about anarchism